Mushemi is a village in Kohgiluyeh and Boyer-Ahmad Province, Iran.

Mushemi may also refer to:
 Mushemi-ye Olya
 Mushemi-ye Sofla
 Mushemi-ye Vosta